The 2022–23 UEFA Europa League is the 52nd season of Europe's secondary club football tournament organised by UEFA, and the 14th season since it was renamed from the UEFA Cup to the UEFA Europa League.

The final will be played at the Puskás Aréna in Budapest, Hungary. Budapest was originally scheduled to host the final match for the 2021–22 UEFA Europa League, but several hosts were shifted because of the delay and ultimate relocation of the 2020 final due to the COVID-19 pandemic.

The winners of the tournament will automatically qualify for the 2023–24 UEFA Champions League group stage, and also earn the right to play against the winners of the 2022–23 UEFA Champions League in the 2023 UEFA Super Cup.

Eintracht Frankfurt were the defending champions, but reached the Champions League knockout phase and were therefore unable to defend their title.

Association team allocation
A total of 58 teams from between 31 and 36 of the 55 UEFA member associations are expected to participate in the 2022–23 UEFA Europa League. Among them, 15 associations have teams directly qualifying for the Europa League, while for the other 40 associations that do not have any teams directly qualifying, between 15 and 20 of them may have teams playing after being transferred from the Champions League (the only member associations which cannot have a participant are Russia and Liechtenstein, which does not organise a domestic league, and can only enter their cup winner into the Europa Conference League given their association ranking). The association ranking based on the UEFA country coefficients is used to determine the number of participating teams for each association:
The title holders of the UEFA Europa Conference League will be given an entry in the Europa League (if they do not qualify for the Champions League group stage).
Associations 1–5 each have two teams qualify.
Associations 6–7 and 9–15 each have one team qualify.
37 teams eliminated from the 2022–23 UEFA Champions League are transferred to the Europa League.

Association ranking
For the 2022–23 UEFA Europa League, the associations are allocated places according to their 2021 UEFA country coefficients, which takes into account their performance in European competitions from 2016–17 to 2020–21.

Apart from the allocation based on the country coefficients, associations may have additional teams participating in the Europa League, as noted below:
 – Additional teams transferred from the UEFA Champions League
 – Additional berth for UEFA Europa Conference League title holders

Distribution
The following is the access list for this season.

Due to the suspension of Russia for the 2022–23 European season, the following changes to the access list have been made:

 The cup winners of associations 13 (Turkey) and 14 (Denmark) enter the play-off round instead of the third qualifying round.
 The cup winners of association 16 (Serbia) enter the third qualifying round instead of the Europa Conference League.

Since the Europa Conference League title holders (Roma) have qualified through their league positions, the following changes to the access list have been made:

 The cup winners of association 7 (Netherlands) enter the group stage instead of the play-off round
 The cup winners of association 15 (Cyprus) enter the play-off round instead of the third qualifying round.
 The cup winners of association 17 (Czech Republic) enter the third qualifying round instead of the Europa Conference League.

Redistribution rules
A Europa League place is vacated when a team qualifies for both the Champions League and the Europa League, or qualifies for the Europa League by more than one method. When a place is vacated, it is redistributed within the national association by the following rules:
When the domestic cup winners (considered as the "highest-placed" qualifier within the national association with the latest starting round) also qualify for the Champions League, their Europa League place is vacated. As a result, the highest-placed team in the league which have not yet qualified for European competitions qualify for the Europa League, with the Europa League qualifiers which finish above them in the league moved up one "place".
When the domestic cup winners also qualify for the Europa League through league position, their place through the league position is vacated. As a result, the highest-placed team in the league which have not yet qualified for European competitions qualify for the Europa League, with the Europa League qualifiers which finish above them in the league moved up one "place" if possible.
For associations where a Europa League place is reserved for either the League Cup or end-of-season European competition play-offs winners, they always qualify for the Europa League as the "lowest-placed" qualifier. If the League Cup winners have already qualified for European competitions through other methods, this reserved Europa League place is taken by the highest-placed team in the league which have not yet qualified for European competitions.

Teams
The labels in the parentheses show how each team qualified for the place of its starting round:
ECL: Europa Conference League title holders
CW: Cup winners
4th, 5th, etc.: League position of the previous season
Abd-: League positions of abandoned season as determined by the national association; all teams are subject to approval by UEFA
UCL: Transferred from the Champions League
GS: Third-placed teams from the group stage
CH/LP PO: Losers from the play-off round (Champions/League Path)
CH/LP Q3: Losers from the third qualifying round (Champions/League Path)
CH/LP Q2: Losers from the second qualifying round (Champions/League Path)

The third qualifying round is divided into Champions Path (CH) and Main Path (MP).

CC: 2022 UEFA club coefficients.

Notes

Schedule
The schedule of the competition is as follows. Matches are scheduled for Thursdays apart from the final, which takes place on a Wednesday, though exceptionally can take place on Tuesdays or Wednesdays due to scheduling conflicts. Scheduled kick-off times starting from the group stage are 18:45 and 21:00 CEST/CET, though exceptionally can take place at 16:30 due to geographical reasons.

As the 2022 FIFA World Cup took place in Qatar between 20 November and 18 December 2022, the group stage commenced in the first week of September 2022 and concluded in the first week of November 2022 to make way for the World Cup.

The draws for the qualifying round were held at the UEFA headquarters in Nyon, Switzerland. The group stage draw took place in Istanbul, Turkey.

Third qualifying round

Play-off round

Group stage

The draw for the group stage was held on 26 August 2022. The 32 teams were drawn into eight groups of four. For the draw, the teams were seeded into four pots, each of eight teams, based on their 2022 UEFA club coefficients (CC). Teams from the same association could not be drawn into the same group.

Bodø/Glimt, Nantes, Union Berlin and Union Saint-Gilloise made their debut appearances in the group stage. Union Saint-Gilloise made their debut appearance in a UEFA competition group stage.

A total of 23 national associations were represented in the group stage.

Group A

Group B

Group C

Group D

Group E

Group F

Group G

Group H

Knockout phase

In the knockout phase, teams play against each other over two legs on a home-and-away basis, except for the one-match final.

Bracket

Knockout round play-offs

Round of 16

Quarter-finals

Semi-finals

Final

Statistics
Statistics exclude qualifying round and play-off round.

Tables updated as of 16 March 2023.

Top goalscorers

Top assists

See also
2022–23 UEFA Champions League
2022–23 UEFA Europa Conference League
2023 UEFA Super Cup
2022–23 UEFA Women's Champions League
2022–23 UEFA Youth League

References

External links

 
1
2022-23
Current association football seasons
Sports events affected by the 2022 Russian invasion of Ukraine